Archbishop Thomas J. Murphy High School is a co-educational private Catholic college-preparatory high school located in Everett, Washington, United States. Founded as Holy Cross High School in 1988 at the old site of Our Lady Of Perpetual Help grade school, it was renamed Archbishop Murphy High School in 1999 and in October moved to its present location.

The school serves students grades nine through twelve; enrollment has increased from 23 students in 1988 to approximately 467 in 2019.

It is named for Thomas Joseph Murphy, the bishop of the Archdiocese of Seattle from 1991 until his death in 1997.

Sports

Cross Country
Track and Field
Football 2016 2A State Champions
Volleyball
Soccer (2015,2016,2017 State Champs)
Wrestling
Basketball 
Golf 
Softball
Baseball 
Swimming 
Tennis
Lacrosse

Since 2004, Archbishop Murphy has been classified as a 2A school by the WIAA.

In the 2016 football season, 5 schools from the Cascade Conference forfeited league football games against the Archbishop Murphy High School Wildcats, citing depth concerns, fear of injury, and competitive imbalance. Archbishop Murphy went on to win their first 2A state football championship in December of that year.

College Credit Courses
The following courses can generate college credit:

Matteo Ricci Program through Seattle University (Social Science 12 Honors, English 12 Honors)-10 credits
Spanish 103/104 program - University of Washington - 5 credits
French 103/104 program - University of Washington - 5 credits
Advanced Placement Calculus AB
Advanced Placement Calculus BC
Advanced Placement Chinese Culture
Advanced Placement Physics
Advanced Placement Computer Science
Advanced Placement Chemistry
Advanced Placement Statistics
Advanced Placement Biology
Advanced Placement Government/Politics
Advanced Placement United States History
Advanced Placement English and Language Composition
Advanced Placement Spanish Language And Culture
Advanced Placement World History
Advanced Placement Macroeconomics

Clubs and Activities 

ASB & Student Council
Campus Ministry
Cheer Squad
Chess Club
Choral-Aires (Honors Choir)
Concert Band
DECA
Jazz Band
General Choir
Fall Play
French Club
Gong Show
HI-Q
Investment Club
Knowledge Bowl
LINK (Student Mentor Program)
Math Team
Mock Trial
National Honor Society
Pep Band
FIRST Robotics Competition (Team 4681)
Spanish Club
Spring Musical (Drama)
Tour Spain/France
Ultimate Frisbee Club
Yearbook
Table Tennis

References

External links
Official site

High schools in Snohomish County, Washington
Catholic secondary schools in Washington (state)
Educational institutions established in 1988
Schools accredited by the Northwest Accreditation Commission
High schools within the Archdiocese of Seattle
Education in Everett, Washington
1988 establishments in Washington (state)